Marcus Simplicinius Genialis was a Roman governor and military leader during the third century CE.

He was the governor of Raetia in 260 when he defected to the Gallic Empire and brought the province under the rule of Postumus. He erected the Augsburg Victory Altar in 260 to commemorate the victory over the Semnones.

References

3rd-century Romans
Roman governors of Raetia